John W. Lathrop (born October 17, 1963) was a brigadier general in the California Army National Guard who served as the commanding general of Train, Advise, and Assist Command South. He is a 1986 graduate of the University of California, Riverside, where he earned a Bachelor of Arts in Public Service and Political Science. He was commissioned through the Claremont College Reserve Officer Training Program where he received an appointment into the Active Component. During his more than 32 years of active and reserve service he has held command and staff positions across the Army, Reserves, and Joint Community in Korea, the United States, and Southwest Asia. He assumed his current assignment in October, 2017. He retired from service on December 31, 2018

Assignments 
Lathrop's tours of duty with warfighting units include the 2nd Infantry Division and 75th Field Artillery Brigade as a Lieutenant; the 40th Corps Support Group as a  Colonel, and Train, Advise, and Assist Command South as a Brigadier General. His joint experience includes serving as the commander for Train, Advise, and Assist Command South, USCENTCOM, Afghanistan.

Commands 
Brigadier General Lathrop has commanded at every level from Company through Divisional command.  His first command was of A Battery, 3rd Battalion, 144th Field Artillery, 40th Infantry Division.  Lathrop's next command assignment was at battalion level, at Detachment 5 State Area Command, Recruiting and Retention in Sacramento, California.

Later, Lathrop served as Commander of the 115th Regional Support Group in Roseville, California, as Commander of the Land Component Command, Los Alamitos, California, and the Commanding General of Train, Advise, and Assist Command South, Afghanistan.

Operational assignments 
Brig. Gen. Lathrop has extensive operational experience, having served as a Commander in Afghanistan and Deputy Commander in Iraq.  Lathrop has also served as an Ammunition Platoon Leader in Southwest Asia and a Fire Direction Officer and Recon/Survey Officer in the Republic of South Korea.

Education 
Brig. Gen. Lathrop holds a Bachelor of Public Service and Political Science degree from the University of California, Riverside, and Master of Management from the University of Redlands.

His military schooling includes Syracuse University, National Security Studies Management Course; National Guard Professional Education Center, Strategic Planning and Management Course; United States Army Logistics Management College, Sustainment Pre Command Course; and the Fletcher School of Law and Diplomacy, Senior Service College.

Awards and decorations

References 

1960 births
Living people
California National Guard personnel
Recipients of the Legion of Merit
United States Army generals
University of California, Riverside alumni